is a Japanese television programme presented by Osamu Shitara and Yūki Himura, a comedy duo known as "Bananaman". It is a regular programme on TV Tokyo on Monday evenings. The show was first broadcast in the form of two pilot shows in June and October 2012 before becoming a recurring series, airing late on Wednesday nights starting 9 January 2013. Due to its popularity, it was moved to the prime time evening slot on Mondays beginning with the episode broadcast on 15 April 2013, where it has been airing (with slight time changes) ever since. In the programme, a team of interviewers go around various airports in Japan, with Narita International Airport as their main reporting hub, and ask non-Japanese arrivals "Why did you come to Japan?". They then attempt to follow the interviewees on their journeys around Japan, in a process called . A question posed for departees is, "What souvenir did you buy?" Besides interviewing people at airports, another skit tries to find non-English teaching foreigners in randomly chosen cities throughout Japan.

The show is narrated by Nigerian-born TV personality Bobby Ologun, with additional voiceovers provided by Daniel Kahl and Carolyn Kawasaki. A special episode aired on 12 November 2018 had members of girl group Nogizaka46, of whom Bananaman are so-called "official brothers", as guest interviewers. The programme has featured coincidental encounters with celebrities at the airport, including British actor Benedict Cumberbatch and American former baseball player Leron Lee.

References

External links

  
 

2012 Japanese television series debuts
Japanese variety television shows
TV Tokyo original programming